The 1916 United States Senate election in Florida was held on November 7, 1916. 

Incumbent Democratic Senator Nathan Philemon Bryan ran for re-election to a second term in office, but lost the Democratic nomination to Governor of Florida Park Trammell. Trammell easily won the general election.

General election

Candidates
R. L. Goodwin (Socialist)
William R. O'Neal (Republican)
Park Trammell (Democratic)

Results

See also 
 1916 United States Senate elections

References 

1916
Florida
United States Senate